Alcohol oxidation is a class of organic reactions in which the alcohol functional group is converted into another functional group (e.g., aldehyde, ketone, carboxylic acid) in which carbon carries a higher oxidation state. 

Through a variety of mechanisms, the removal of a hydride equivalent converts a primary or secondary alcohol to an aldehyde or ketone, respectively.  The oxidation of primary alcohols to carboxylic acids normally proceeds via the corresponding aldehyde, which is transformed via an aldehyde hydrate (gem-diol, R-CH(OH)2) by reaction with water. Thus, the oxidation of a primary alcohol at the aldehyde level without further oxidation to the carboxylic acid is possible by performing the reaction in absence of water, so that no aldehyde hydrate can be formed.

Oxidation to aldehydes

Oxidation of alcohols to aldehydes is partial oxidation; aldehydes are further oxidized to carboxylic acids. Conditions required for making aldehydes are heat and distillation. In aldehyde formation, the temperature of the reaction should be kept above the boiling point of the aldehyde and below the boiling point of the alcohol.

Reagents useful for the transformation of primary alcohols to aldehydes are normally also suitable for the oxidation of secondary alcohols to ketones. These include:

Chromium-based reagents, such as Collins reagent (CrO3·Py2), PDC or PCC.
Sulfonium species known as "activated DMSO" which can result from reaction of DMSO with electrophiles, such as oxalyl chloride (Swern oxidation), a carbodiimide (Pfitzner-Moffatt oxidation) or the complex SO3·Py (Parikh-Doering oxidation).
Hypervalent iodine compounds, such as Dess-Martin periodinane or 2-Iodoxybenzoic acid.
Catalytic TPAP in presence of excess of NMO (Ley oxidation).
Catalytic TEMPO in presence of excess bleach (NaOCl) (Oxoammonium-catalyzed oxidation).
Catalytic transition metal complex in the presence of dioxygen or another terminal oxidant.

Allylic and benzylic alcohols can be oxidized in presence of other alcohols using certain selective oxidants such as manganese dioxide (MnO2).

Oxidation to ketones

Reagents useful for the oxidation of secondary alcohols to ketones, but normally inefficient for oxidation of primary alcohols to aldehydes, include chromium trioxide (CrO3) in a mixture of sulfuric acid and acetone (Jones oxidation) and certain ketones, such as cyclohexanone, in the presence of aluminium isopropoxide (Oppenauer oxidation). Another method is oxoammonium-catalyzed oxidation. Additionally, sodium hypochlorite (or household bleach) in acetone has been reported for efficient conversion of secondary alcohols in the presence of primary alcohols (Stevens oxidation).

Oxidation to carboxylic acids

The direct oxidation of primary alcohols to carboxylic acids can be carried out using

Potassium permanganate (KMnO4);
Jones oxidation;
PDC in DMF;
Heyns oxidation;
NaOCl;
Ruthenium tetroxide (RuO4);
or TEMPO.

Diol oxidation

Alcohols possessing two hydroxy groups located on adjacent carbons —that is, vicinal diols/ 1,2-diols — suffer oxidative breakage at a carbon-carbon bond with some oxidants such as sodium periodate (NaIO4), (diacetoxyiodo)benzene  (PhI(OAc)2) or lead tetraacetate (Pb(OAc)4), resulting in generation of two carbonyl groups. The reaction is also known as glycol cleavage.

References 

Organic redox reactions